Emergency Wedding (titled Jealousy in the UK) is a 1950 American comedy film directed by Edward Buzzell and starring Larry Parks, Barbara Hale and Willard Parker. It is a remake of You Belong to Me, a film in which Parks appeared in a bit part.

Plot
Dr. Helen Hunt is a physician married to millionaire Peter Judson Kirk Jr. who is jealous that his wife is spending too much time with her male patients. He makes a fool of himself trying to prove her guilt, which causes his wife to leave. But when he donates funds for a new hospital, she returns to him.

Cast
Larry Parks as Peter Judson Kirk
Barbara Hale as Dr. Helen Hunt  
Willard Parker as Vandemer
Una Merkel as Emma
Alan Reed as Tony
Eduard Franz as Dr. Heimer
Irving Bacon as Filbert - Mechanic
Don Beddoe as Forbish - Floorwalker
Jim Backus as Ed Hamley
Vince Gironda as Gym Guy

Reception
In a contemporary review for The New York Times, critic A. H. Weiler wrote that Claude Binyon's script was largely a facsimile of Dalton Trumbo's script for the 1941 film You Belong to Me. Weiler described Emergency Wedding as "lightweight without being especially gay or serious" and "an unimpressive reproduction."

References

External links

1950 films
Films directed by Edward Buzzell
Remakes of American films
Columbia Pictures films
American comedy-drama films
1950 comedy-drama films
American black-and-white films
1950s English-language films
1950s American films